"Baby If You're Ready" is a song by American trio Doggy's Angels featuring LaToiya Williams. It was released on November 25, 2000, as the first single off their debut studio album Pleezbaleevit!. "Baby If You're Ready" went to No. 1 hit on the Billboard Rap Songs chart and stayed there for nine weeks.

Track listing 
Side A
Baby If You're Ready (Clean) (featuring Latoya Williams) — 3:43
Baby If You're Ready (Instrumental) — 3:40
Side B
Baby If You're Ready (Album version) (featuring Latoya Williams) — 3:43
Baby If You're Ready (Acapella) (featuring Latoya Williams) — 3:43

Charts

Weekly charts

See also 
 List of Billboard number-one rap singles of the 2000s

References 

Snoop Dogg songs
2000 singles
2000 songs
G-funk songs
TVT Records singles
Gangsta rap songs